Allegra's Window is an American musical children's television series that aired on Nickelodeon through its Nick Jr. block from October 24, 1994, to December 8, 1996, with reruns being shown until February 5, 1999; it was later shown on Noggin from February 2, 1999, to April 6, 2003. The series deals with the daily life of a precocious, imaginative puppet character named Allegra, and featured live actors, puppets and animation similar to that of Sesame Street. The show was created by Jan Fleming, John Hoffman and Jim Jinkins, the latter of whom is also the creator of Doug. Two of the puppeteers, Kathryn Mullen and Anthony Asbury, would later work together on the PBS series Between the Lions as the performers of Lionel and Leona Lion.

The series also spawned a series of music videos aired during interstitials that aired on Nick Jr.

In the 2010s, the first season was released on iTunes and Amazon Video. However, the whole series was released for viewing on Noggin's paid-subscription service from its initial launch. After Noggin removed the series in early 2020, it was added to ViacomCBS' streaming service Paramount+ in January 2021.

Synopsis
The series follows Allegra through the daily triumphs, trials, and tribulations of being a little girl. She and her big brother Rondo, along with her best friend Lindi (a yellow dog), a pesky blue neighborhood cat named Riff and a green boy named Poco all try to learn about the world around them with the help of their neighborhood friends. At the end of each episode, Allegra sits at her window and reflects on all the lessons she has learned. The series was music-based and included musically inspired characters named Lindi, Rondo, Riff, Poco, Reed, Miss Melody, Ellington, Encora, Sonata, Clef, Woofer, Aria, Tweeter, Flugie, Vi, and of course, Allegra the title character's name herself. There were also segments that feature talking musical instruments that live on the wall of Reed's Music shop.

Over 100 original songs were created for the series, under the oversight of musical director Don Sebesky. 
 
The original decision to use the name Allegra for the show's lead occurred after creator/executive producer Jan Fleming attended a dinner party at the house of London-based academics and was introduced to their youngest daughter, Allegra. That evening, she remarked that it would be a great name for the little girl at the center of the project she was working on.

Characters
 Allegra (performed and voiced by Kathryn Mullen) is the title character of the series, a 3-year-old girl. She is just learning about the world outside of her home and is quite brave. She mostly encounters problems and is always relied on her friends to find a solution. She also is known for having curly doodle hair, which Rondo points out and hates the fact that he does. She is also the leader of the gang.
 Rondo (performed and voiced by Anthony Asbury) is the older brother of Allegra. He is 6 years old and often tries to act tough. Nevertheless, he has a great deal of love and protection for his younger sister. It is mentioned that he is in the first grade by Allegra. In some episodes, Rondo walks upside down with his shoes on up.
 Lindi (performed and voiced by Pam Arciero) is a yellow dog who is Allegra's best friend and lives with Reed. She is feisty and often acts as her voice of reason in many cases throughout the series. She loves playing in the mud and also enjoys dance, especially ballet. 
 Riff (voiced by Martin P. Robinson) is the pesky and grumpy neighborhood blue cat and Rondo's best friend and also a big brother type to him. Although he frequently takes advantage of Allegra's naivety, his favorite target is Mr. Cook. He becomes nicer as the series progresses.
 Mr. Cook (performed and voiced by Timothy Lagasse) is the town baker who is frequently the butt of Riff's antics. He is generally upbeat and always speaks in third person and also speaks broken English. Rather than saying their names, he usually refers to the other characters based on their personality and appearance.
 Poco (voiced by Anthony Asbury) is Mr. Cook's nephew. The funniest and most curious character of the show, he tells jokes and teams up with Allegra, Rondo, Lindi, and Riff. Like his uncle, he also speaks in third person. He is the youngest character, being only 2 years old. Poco appears in the second and third seasons of the show.
 Reed (played by Bob Stillman) is a musician who runs the town's music shop. He is also Lindi's master. In the first season, he was depicted as being easily forgetful.
 Miss Melody (played by Andrea Frierson) is a teacher who runs Little Blue Daycare and favors Allegra.
 Ellington (played by Harry Burney) is the oldest resident of Hummingbird Alley. He is very kind and gentle to everyone in town, especially towards the kids. He appears in the first season only.
 Encora (played by Joanne Baum) is a friendly and energetic mail carrier with a love for singing. She rides a bicycle which she calls her "recycle cycle". She was introduced at the beginning of the second season.
 Sonata (performed and voiced by Pam Arciero) is Allegra and Rondo's mother.
 Clef (performed and voiced by Martin P. Robinson) is Allegra and Rondo's father.
 Grandma (performed and voiced by Heather Asch) is Allegra and Rondo's grandmother and Sonata's mother.
 Woofer, Aria, and Tweeter (performed by Anthony Asbury, Heather Asch, and Tim Lagasse) are three tiny hummingbirds who live in a nest above a tree in Reed's piano garden.
 Flugie and Vi (performed and voiced by Martin P. Robinson and Heather Asch) are a tuba and a viola who hang on a wall at Reed's music shop.
 Steve is an Australian green tree frog who is Allegra and Rondo's pet. He appears in the second season only. 
 Arnold is an insect who is the pet of the three hummingbirds.

Production
Allegra's Window was taped at Nickelodeon Studios in Orlando at Universal Studios Florida, and was produced by Topstone Productions and Jumbo Pictures.

Episodes

Series overview

Season 1 (1994)

Season 2 (1995–1996)

Season 3 (1996)

VHS releases
 Allegra's Window: Small is Beautiful (Released on July 25, 1995, by Sony Wonder)
 Allegra's Window: Waiting for Grandma (Released on August 29, 1995, by Sony Wonder)
 Allegra's Window: Storytime Sing-Along (Released on March 26, 1996, by Sony Wonder)
 Allegra's Window: Allegra's Christmas (Released on October 15, 1996)
 Allegra's Window: Play Along with Allegra and Friends (Released on May 13, 1997)
 Allegra's Window: Sing Along with Allegra & Lindi (Released on April 7, 1998)

See also
 Sesame Street
 Big Bag
 Bear in the Big Blue House
 Between the Lions

References

External links 
 
 Allegra's Window at locatetv.com

1990s American children's television series
1990s Nickelodeon original programming
1994 American television series debuts
1996 American television series endings
1990s preschool education television series
American preschool education television series
American animated musical television series
American television series with live action and animation
American television shows featuring puppetry
English-language television shows
Nick Jr. original programming
Television series about children
Television series created by Jim Jinkins